Edwin Phillips Granberry (18 April 1897 – 5 December 1988) was an American writer, novelist and translator. In 1932, he won the O. Henry Award for Best Short Short Story.

Edwin Granberry was born in Meridian, Mississippi and went to Starkville High School in Starkville, Mississippi. He was educated at the University of Florida (from 1916 to 1918), at Columbia University (in 1920) and at Harvard University (from 1922 to 1924).

New York Sun
Granberry became an English professor at Rollins College in 1933. Granberry was a reviewer (for The New York Sun) of Margaret Mitchell's Gone with the Wind, which he compared favorably to War and Peace by Leo Tolstoy. Later, Granberry and his wife, Mabel, became friends with Mitchell.

Buz Sawyer
Today, Granberry is best known for his 30-year run as a writer on the Roy Crane comic strip Buz Sawyer, which he continued scripting after Crane's death in 1977.

Television
In 1955, Granberry was a scripter for the anthology drama television series Star Tonight.

Novels
The Ancient Hunger (Macaulay, 1927)
The Erl King (Macaulay, 1930)
Strangers and Lovers (Signet, 1951)
A Trip to Czardis (Trident, 1966)

Awards
In 1932, Granberry won the O. Henry Award for Best Short Short Story, "A Trip to Czardis", which he later expanded into a novel and an unproduced screenplay.

References

External links

Mississippi Writers and Musicians
Rollins College
Edwin Granberry Collection owned by the University of Mississippi Department of Archives and Special Collections.

1897 births
1988 deaths
20th-century American novelists
American male novelists
Columbia University alumni
Harvard University alumni
University of Florida alumni
20th-century American male writers
Starkville High School alumni